Billboard Year-End charts are cumulative rankings of entries in Billboard magazine charts in the United States in any given chart year.  Several hundred Year-End charts are now published by Billboard, the most important of which are the single or album charts based on Hot 100 and Billboard 200 respectively.

Billboard's "chart year" runs from the first Billboard "week" of December to the final week in November, but because the Billboard week is dated in advance of publication, the last calendar week for which sales are counted is usually the third week in November. This altered calendar allows for Billboard to calculate year-end charts and release them in time for its final print issue in the last week of December.  

Due to this methodology, albums at the peak of their popularity at the time of the November/December chart-year cutoff many times end up ranked lower than one would expect on a year-end tally, yet are ranked on the following year's chart as well, as their cumulative points are split between the two chart years.

History
Various listings, such as top radio tunes, popular songs on jukebox, top artists, and best-selling sheet music of the year, had been published for a number of years. Best-selling records of the year based on Billboards Music Popularity Charts was also published for 1942.  A chart covering the year 1945 based on "Honor Roll of Hits", where the same song by different artists were amalgamated into one, was published. 

In 1946, Billboard started to release its first annual charts, initially called "Annual Music Record Poll", which included records charts where songs by different artists were listed separately. In the early years, the annual charts for a particular year were released in January the following year. Starting in 1952, the release date was moved earlier to December the same year to provide disk jockeys with listings for their end-of-year programming. The chart year therefore also shifted, for example, the year of 1952 covered the first week of the year until the December 20 issue.  Billboard's chart year now runs from the first Billboard "week" of December to the final week of November.

Methodology
Prior to incorporating chart data from Nielsen SoundScan (from 1991), year-end charts were calculated by an inverse-point system based solely on a title's performance (for example a single appearing on the Billboard Hot 100 would be given one point for a week spent at position 100, two points for a week spent at position ninety-nine, and so forth, up to 100 points for each week spent at number one). Other factors including the total weeks a song spent on the chart and at its peak position were calculated into its year-end total.  The same method was used for albums based on the Billboard 200, and songs appearing on the other charts (e.g. Hot Country Singles).

After Billboard began obtaining sales and airplay information from Nielsen SoundScan and Nielsen Broadcast Data Systems, the year-end charts are now calculated by a very straightforward cumulative total of yearlong sales (or sales and airplay) points. This gives a more accurate picture of any given year's most popular titles, as an entry that hypothetically spent nine weeks at number one in the spring could possibly have earned fewer cumulative points than one spending six weeks at number three in January. 

Exceptions appeared to be in the 1980s as songs with chart runs were as high as they were as if they were in the chart for a whole year. Two examples are "Desire" by U2 and "How Can I Fall?" by Breathe (both in 1988), which both peaked at number 3 in November and December, respectively. "Desire" came in at number 56 in the 1988 year-end, then "How Can I Fall?" would take the number 27 spot in 1989, despite "Desire" appearing in only nine issues of the chart in the 1988 charting year, and "How Can I Fall?" having appeared in five in 1989. ("He's So Shy" had 14 in the 1980 charting year and in 12 in that of 1981, but appeared in neither year-end.)

Songs are also not always placed as high in the Decade-End and All Time charts as they were in the Year-End. In the Decade-End, an example is in the 2008 year end which showed "No Air" by Jordin Sparks and Chris Brown and "I Kissed a Girl" by Katy Perry at numbers six and 14 respectively, but only "I Kissed a Girl" was in the decade-end of the two, at number 66. And another example is from the 1979 year end where "My Sharona" by The Knack is the number one song of 1979, but lower than "Hot Stuff" by Donna Summer in the all time chart. ("My Sharona" is number 95, "Hot Stuff" at No. 87 and number seven in the 1979 year-end.)

George Michael, the Beatles, Elton John (under Dionne & Friends for the song "That's What Friends Are For") and Elvis Presley are the only four artists to have ever achieved two year-end number-ones. The Beatles, Usher and Justin Bieber are the only three artists to hold the top-two positions of the Year-End Hot 100.

Billboard year-end number ones

 Pop
Singles: Best Sellers in Stores ('40s-1958), Billboard Hot 100 (1958-present)
Albums: Best-Selling Popular Albums (1955–1956), Best-Selling Pop Albums (1956–1957), Best-Selling Pop LPs (1957–1959), Top LPs (1963–1972), Top LPs & Tapes (1972–1984), Top 200 Albums (1984), Top Pop Albums (1985–1991), The Billboard 200 Top Albums (1991–1992), Billboard 200 (1992-present), Top Artists (1981-present)

Between 1959 and 1963 the chart was divided in a stereo chart and a mono chart and were named Best-Selling Stereophonic LPs and Best-Selling Monophonic LPs (1959–1960), Stereo Action Charts and Mono Action Charts (1960–1961), Action Albums—Stereophonic and Action Albums—Monophonic (1961) and Top LPs—Stereo and Top LPs—Monaural (1961–1963).
 R&B / Soul / Hip-hop
Singles: Hot Soul Singles, Hot Black Singles, Hot R&B Singles, Hot R&B/Hip-Hop Singles & Tracks, Hot R&B/Hip-Hop Songs (Note: Billboard did not publish a singles chart for R&B songs from late 1963 through early 1965.)
Albums: Top Soul Albums, Top Black Albums, Top R&B/Hip-Hop Albums
 Country
Singles: Hot Country Singles, Hot Country Singles & Tracks, Hot Country Songs
Albums: Top Country Albums

See also
 List of best-selling albums by year in the United States

References

Sources
Joel Whitburn's Top Pop Singles 1955–2002
Joel Whitburn Presents the Billboard Albums, 6th edition,
Additional information obtained can be verified within Billboards online archive services and print editions of the magazine.

External links
Billboard Year-End charts